Alexandru Mihai Țăruș (born 9 May 1989) is a Romanian rugby union footballer. He plays as a prop and he currently plays for Rouen

He was formed as a player at RC Braşov. As a junior player he won the Junior World Cup (2009) with the National U20 Team in Kenya. He played for RC Timişoara in the Romanian Rugby Championship.

He has 9 caps for Romania, since his debut at the 30-8 win over Argentina Jaguars in Bucharest at 12 June 2013, for the IRB Nations Cup. He was called for the 2015 Rugby World Cup, playing in two games as a substitute but without scoring. He still has to score his first international points.

On 10 April 2017, Țăruș travels to England to join Aviva Premiership side Sale Sharks on a two-year contract ahead of the 2017-18 season.

On 15 April 2019, Tarus left Sale Sharks to join Italian club Zebre in the Pro14 from the 2019-20 season to 2020-21 season.

After playing for Romania Under 20 in 2009, from 2013 Tarus was named in the Romania squad.

References

External links

 Alexandru Țăruș profile at Zebre Official Website

1989 births
Living people
Romanian rugby union players
Rugby union props
SCM Rugby Timișoara players
București Wolves players
Sportspeople from Brașov
Romanian expatriate sportspeople in England
Expatriate rugby union players in England
Romania international rugby union players
Sale Sharks players
CSA Steaua București (rugby union) players
CSU Aurel Vlaicu Arad players
AS Béziers Hérault players
Zebre Parma players
Rouen Normandie Rugby players